Thioalkalicoccus is a Gram-negative, mesophilic and obligate alkaliphilic genus of bacteria from the family of Chromatiaceae with one known species (Thioalkalicoccus limnaeus). Thioalkalicoccus limnaeus occurs in brackish water lakes.

References

Chromatiales
Bacteria genera
Monotypic bacteria genera
Taxa described in 2000